The surname Babka may refer to:
 Daniel Babka (born 1972), Slovak professional ice hockey defenceman 
 Jim Babka (born 1968), American writer, activist, and former radio talk-show host
 John J. Babka (1884–1937), U.S. Representative from Ohio
 Marie Babka, former member of the Ohio House of Representatives from Cuyahoga County
 Rink Babka (1936–2022), former American discus thrower